The klaxophone is a musical instrument created by the American composer Henry Fillmore. Made of twelve car horns, it was created for use in his march The Klaxon: March of the Automobiles, which was composed in 1929 for the 1930 Cincinnati Automobile Show. This piece featured the instrument mounted onto a table and powered by a car battery.

References

Aerophones
Experimental musical instruments